The 1986–87 NHL season was the 70th season of the National Hockey League. The Edmonton Oilers won the Stanley Cup by beating the Philadelphia Flyers four games to three in the Cup finals.

League business
The Chicago-based club officially changed their name from the two-worded "Black Hawks" to the one-worded "Blackhawks" based on the spelling found in their original franchise documents.

Regular season
The Oilers won their second straight Presidents' Trophy as the top team and Wayne Gretzky won his eighth straight Hart Memorial Trophy and his seventh straight Art Ross Trophy.

On November 26, 1986, Toronto's Borje Salming was accidentally cut in the face by a skate, requiring more than 200 stitches. It was the third injury to his face and Salming returned to play wearing a visor.

On January 22, 1987, a massive blizzard resulted in only 334 spectators attending the game between the New Jersey Devils and the Calgary Flames at the Brendan Byrne Arena, leading to the Devils dubbing the spectators the "334 Club".

On April 4, 1987, the Islanders' captain Denis Potvin became the first NHL defenceman to reach 1000 points. A shot by the Islanders' Mikko Makela deflected in off Potvin's arm in a 6–6 shootout between the Islanders and Sabres.

Final standings
Note: W = Wins, L = Losses, T = Ties, GF= Goals For, GA = Goals Against, Pts = Points, PIM = Penalties in minutes

Prince of Wales Conference

Clarence Campbell Conference

Playoffs

In an attempt to reduce the number of first round upsets, the NHL expanded the best-of-five series in the first round to a best-of-seven series.

Playoff bracket

Stanley Cup Finals

The Oilers and Flyers met again in the final for the second time in three years. This time, Edmonton was the regular season champion with 50 wins and 106 points, and Philadelphia was second with 46 wins and 100 points. Unlike the 1985 final, this series would go the full seven games. Edmonton took the first two games at home, then split in Philadelphia. However, the Flyers won the next two games, one in Edmonton and one back in Philadelphia by one goal, to force a deciding seventh game. Edmonton won game seven to earn its third Stanley Cup in four seasons. This was the first final to go seven games, since 1971.

Awards

All-Star teams

Source: NHL

Player statistics

Scoring leaders

Note: GP = Games played; G = Goals; A = Assists; Pts = Points, PIM = Penalties in minutes, PPG = Powerplay Goals, SHG = Shorthanded Goals, GWG = Game Winning Goals

Source: NHL.

Leading goaltenders
Minimum 2000 min. GP = Games played; Min = Minutes played; W = Wins; L = Losses; T = Ties; SO = Shutouts; GAA = Goals against average; Sv% = Save percentage

Coaches

Patrick Division
New Jersey Devils: Doug Carpenter
New York Islanders: Terry Simpson
New York Rangers: Tom Webster
Philadelphia Flyers: Mike Keenan
Pittsburgh Penguins: Bob Berry
Washington Capitals: Bryan Murray

Adams Division
Boston Bruins: Terry O'Reilly
Buffalo Sabres: Scotty Bowman and Craig Ramsay
Hartford Whalers: Jack Evans
Montreal Canadiens: Jean Perron
Quebec Nordiques: Michel Bergeron

Norris Division
Chicago Blackhawks: Bob Pulford
Detroit Red Wings: Jacques Demers
Minnesota North Stars: Lorne Henning and Glen Sonmor
St. Louis Blues: Jacques Martin
Toronto Maple Leafs: John Brophy

Smythe Division
Calgary Flames: Bob Johnson
Edmonton Oilers: Glen Sather
Los Angeles Kings: Pat Quinn and Mike Murphy
Vancouver Canucks: Tom Watt
Winnipeg Jets: Dan Maloney

Debuts
The following is a list of players of note who played their first NHL game in 1986–87 (listed with their first team, asterisk(*) marks debut in playoffs):
Gary Roberts, Calgary Flames
Joe Nieuwendyk, Calgary Flames
Dave Manson, Chicago Blackhawks
Joe Murphy, Detroit Red Wings
Steve Chiasson, Detroit Red Wings
Kelly Buchberger*, Edmonton Oilers
Jimmy Carson, Los Angeles Kings
Luc Robitaille, Los Angeles Kings
Steve Duchesne, Los Angeles Kings
Craig Berube, Philadelphia Flyers
Ron Hextall, Philadelphia Flyers
Vincent Damphousse, Toronto Maple Leafs
Fredrik Olausson, Winnipeg Jets

Last games
The following is a list of players of note that played their last game in the NHL in 1986–87 (listed with their last team):
Thomas Gradin, Boston Bruins
Mike Milbury, Boston Bruins
Lee Fogolin, Buffalo Sabres
Don Lever, Buffalo Sabres
Gilbert Perreault, Buffalo Sabres
Phil Russell, Buffalo Sabres
Doug Risebrough, Calgary Flames
Murray Bannerman, Chicago Blackhawks
Darryl Sutter, Chicago Blackhawks
Danny Gare, Edmonton Oilers
Wayne Babych, Hartford Whalers
Peter McNab, New Jersey Devils
Mike Bossy, New York Islanders
Chico Resch, Philadelphia Flyers (Last player born in the 1940s)

1987 Trading Deadline
 Trading Deadline: March 10, 1987 
March 10, 1987: Paul Boutilier traded from Boston to Minnesota for Minnesota's fourth round choice in 1988 Entry Draft.
March 10, 1987: Raimo Helminen traded from NY Rangers to Minnesota for future considerations.
March 10, 1987: Raimo Summanen traded from Edmonton to Vancouver for Moe Lemay.
March 10, 1987: Stu Kulak traded from Edmonton to NY Rangers, completing an earlier trade for Reijo Ruotsalainen.
March 10, 1987: Marcel Dionne, Jeff Crossman and Los Angeles' third round choice in 1989 Entry Draft traded from Los Angeles to NY Rangers for Bob Carpenter and Tom Laidlaw.

See also
 List of Stanley Cup champions
 1986 NHL Entry Draft
 1986–87 NHL transactions
 NHL All-Rookie Team
 Rendez-vous '87
 1986 in sports
 1987 in sports
 Easter Epic

References
Notes

Bibliography

External links
Hockey Database
NHL.com

 
1
1